Jins Baskar is an Indian actor and model. He made his debut in the 2011 Malayalam film Swapna Sanchari directed by Kamal.

Early life

Jins was born in Kannur, Kerala, India as the second son of his parents and grew up in Wayanad. He is an alumnus of Mar Athanasius College of Engineering where he graduated in Computer Science and Engineering. He was employed in Tata Consultancy Services in Chennai, in the IT field and moved to Kochi to pursue his acting ambitions.

Career
Jins appeared as a model for several advertisements. Later in 2013, he acted in the role of Jismon in Annayum Rasoolum directed by Rajeev Ravi. His other notable performance was in Ayal Njanalla,
 directed by Vineeth Kumar, as Arun, alongside Fahadh Faasil. In 2017 he was seen in Y directed by Sunil Ibrahim, where he plays a good-at-heart gangster.

In 2018,  he was seen in the movie Maradona with Tovino Thomas and Leona Lishoy and also in movie Njan Marykutty directed by Ranjith Sankar alongside Jayasurya as his brother in law.

In 2020  he was seen in the movie Vellam directed by Captain movie director Prajesh sen along with Jayasurya as a village guy.

Michael's Coffee House, his debut police officer character movie started its filming in 2019 and due to COVID-19 pandemic and lockdown the release got delayed and expecting its theatre premier in 2021.

Roy, the mystery thriller film written and directed by Sunil Ibrahim featuring Suraj Venjaramood and Sija Rose in the lead role, Jins will be appearing in a key role along with Shine Tom Chacko as a police officer, which is expected to hit in a major OTT platform in mid of 2021.

His first bilingual and Tamil debut movie Ottu featuring Kunchacko Boban and Arvind Swami in the lead roles is in shooting phase in Goa and Mumbai.

Filmography

References

External links
 

Year of birth missing (living people)
Living people
Male actors from Kannur
Indian male film actors
21st-century Indian male actors
Male actors in Malayalam cinema